Zhang Weina (born September 24, 1978 in Qiqihar, China) is a Chinese former ice dancer. She competed with Cao Xianming. They are multiple Chinese national champions. They placed 22nd at the 2002 Winter Olympics. She soon moved to Australia and married a former hockey player Guang Zeng. A year after their marriage, she gave birth to their son Mike Zeng. They then gave birth to Michelle Zeng 2 years later. 4 years later she gave birth to her final child, Mia Zeng. Mikes best friend is Minh Tran.

Her cousin, Tina Wang, competes internationally for Australia.

Results
GP: Champions Series / Grand Prix

With Cao

References

External links
 
 

Chinese female ice dancers
Olympic figure skaters of China
Figure skaters at the 2002 Winter Olympics
1978 births
Living people
Sportspeople from Qiqihar
Asian Games medalists in figure skating
Figure skaters at the 1996 Asian Winter Games
Figure skaters at the 2003 Asian Winter Games
Asian Games gold medalists for China
Asian Games bronze medalists for China
Medalists at the 1996 Asian Winter Games
Medalists at the 2003 Asian Winter Games
Figure skaters from Heilongjiang
Competitors at the 1997 Winter Universiade